The inverted question mark, and inverted exclamation mark, are punctuation marks used to begin interrogative and exclamatory sentences or clauses in Spanish and some languages which have cultural ties with Spain, such as Asturian and Waray languages. The initial marks are mirrored at the end of the sentence or clause by the 'ordinary' question mark, or exclamation mark, .

Inverted marks are supported by various standards, including ISO-8859-1, Unicode, and HTML. They can be entered directly on keyboards designed for Spanish-speaking countries.

Usage

The inverted question mark  is written before the first letter of an interrogative sentence or clause to indicate that a question follows. It is a rotated form of the standard symbol "?" recognized by speakers of other languages written with the Latin script. A normal question mark is written at the end of the sentence or clause.

Inverted punctuation is especially critical in Spanish since the syntax of the language means that both statements and questions or exclamations could have the same wording.

In sentences that are both declarative and interrogative, the clause that asks a question is isolated with the starting-symbol inverted question mark, for example:  ("If you cannot go with them, would you like to go with us?"), not  This helps to recognize questions and exclamations in long sentences.

Unlike the ending marks, which are printed along the baseline of the text, the inverted marks (¿ and ¡) descend below the line.

History 

In 1668, John Wilkins proposed using the inverted exclamation mark "¡" as a symbol at the end of a sentence to denote irony. He was one of many, including Desiderius Erasmus, who felt there was a need for such a punctuation mark, but Wilkins' proposal, as was true of the other attempts, failed to take hold.

("How old are you?"). The Real Academia also ordered the same inverted-symbol system for statements of exclamation, using the symbols "¡" and "!".

These new rules were slowly adopted; there are 19th-century books in which the writer uses neither "¡" nor "¿".

Adoption 
Some writers omit the inverted question mark in the case of a short unambiguous question such as:  ("Who comes?"). This is the criterion in Galician  and formerly in Catalan. Certain Catalan-language authorities, such as Joan Solà i Cortassa, insist that both the opening and closing question marks be used for clarity. The current IEC prescription for Catalan is not to use the inverted marks.

Some Spanish-language writers, among them Nobel laureate Pablo Neruda (1904–1973), refuse to use the inverted question mark.

It is common on social media to omit the inverted question mark since it saves typing time. Some also use the ending symbol for both beginning and ending, like this: . Given the informal setting, this might be unimportant; however, teachers see this as a problem, fearing and claiming that contemporary young students are inappropriately and incorrectly extending the practice to academic homework and essays. (See .)

Mixtures  
It is acceptable in Spanish to begin a sentence with an opening inverted exclamation mark ("¡") and end it with a question mark ("?"), or vice versa, for statements that are questions but also have a clear sense of exclamation or surprise such as:  ("And who do you think you are?!"). Normally, four signs are used, always with one type in the outer side and the other in the inner side (nested)

Unicode 5.1 also includes , which is an inverted version of the interrobang, a nonstandard punctuation mark used to denote both excitement and a question in one glyph. It is also known as a "gnaborretni" (interrobang spelled backwards).

Computer usage

Encodings
 
 
The characters also appear in most extended ASCII encodings.

In Windows, an inverted question mark is valid in a file or directory name, whereas the normal question mark is a reserved character which cannot be used.

Typing the character

Auto-correct will often turn a normal mark typed at the start of a sentence to the inverted one.

See also 
 Spanish orthography

References 

Spanish language
Punctuation
Interrogative words and phrases
Catalan language